Koshido Dam (越戸ダム) is a gravity dam located in Aichi Prefecture in Japan. The dam is used for power production. The catchment area of the dam is 900.8 km2. The dam impounds about 48  ha of land when full and can store 2876 thousand cubic meters of water. The construction of the dam was started on 1926 and completed in 1929.

References

Dams in Aichi Prefecture
1929 establishments in Japan